Carex leptonervia, also known as nerveless woodland sedge, is a species of flowering plant in the sedge family, Cyperaceae. It is native to Eastern Canada and the United States.

See also
 List of Carex species

References

leptonervia
Plants described in 1914
Flora of North America